Gilcrest Peak is an 11,575-foot-elevation (3,528 meter) summit located in the Sierra Nevada mountain range, in Mono County of northern California, United States. The mountain is set within the Hoover Wilderness, on land managed by Inyo National Forest. Precipitation runoff from this mountain drains to Lundy Lake, Mill Creek, and ultimately Mono Lake. The mountain's toponym has been officially adopted by the United States Board on Geographic Names.

Climate
Gilcrest Peak is located in an alpine climate zone. Most weather fronts originate in the Pacific Ocean, and travel east toward the Sierra Nevada mountains. As fronts approach, they are forced upward by the peaks (orographic lift), causing moisture in the form of rain or snowfall to drop onto the range.

See also

 Lundy, California

Gallery

References

External links
 Weather forecast: Gilcrest Peak

Mountains of Mono County, California
North American 3000 m summits
Mountains of Northern California
Sierra Nevada (United States)
Inyo National Forest